The Australian cricket team toured New Zealand in the 1973-74 season to play a three-match Test series against New Zealand. The series was drawn 1-1. It was the first time New Zealand had beaten Australia in a Test match, and the first time they had won a Test match since 1969.

Australian squad
Australia had just defeated New Zealand 2-0 in a series in Australia.

Paul Sheahan was unavailable for selection. The team selected was as follows:
Batsmen - Ian Chappell (captain), Greg Chappell, Keith Stackpole, Ian Davis, Ian Redpath, Ashley Woodcock, Doug Walters
Fast bowlers - Max Walker, Geoff Dymock
Spinners - Ray Bright, Ashley Mallett, Kerry O'Keeffe
All-rounders - Gary Gilmour
Wicketkeepers - Rod Marsh
Manager - Frank Bryant

Test series

1st Test

2nd Test

There was controversy during the match when New Zealand batsman Glenn Turner argued on the field with Ian Chappell.

3rd Test

The New Zealand second innings of 158 is the lowest all-out Test innings to include a century partnership (Glenn Turner and John Parker added 107 runs for the first wicket).

ODI series

1st ODI

2nd ODI

References

External links
Australia in New Zealand in 1973-74 at Cricinfo
Australia in New Zealand 1973-74 at CricketArchive

Further reading
Dick Brittenden, "Australia in New Zealand, 1973-74", Wisden 1975, pp. 944–57

1974 in Australian cricket
1973-74
1974 in New Zealand cricket
New Zealand cricket seasons from 1970–71 to 1999–2000
International cricket competitions from 1970–71 to 1975